Jhon Bélmer Aguilar López (born 11 November 1973) is a retired Colombian football defender.

References

External links
 

1973 births
Living people
Sportspeople from Antioquia Department
Colombian footballers
Categoría Primera A players
Independiente Medellín footballers
Atlético Bucaramanga footballers
Atlético Junior footballers
Millonarios F.C. players
Envigado F.C. players
Deportivo Pereira footballers
Atlético Huila footballers
Deportes Quindío footballers
América de Cali footballers
Cortuluá footballers
Association football defenders
Boyacá Chicó managers